Tokugoro Ito (1878-1939) was a Japanese judoka and professional wrestler. Ito was one of the founding fathers of mixed martial arts in Brazil.

Early years
Ito was an instructor of judo at Tokyo Imperial University in Japan. In 1911,  Akitaro Ono and Tokugoro Ito joined Mitsuyo Maeda and Soshihiro Satake in Cuba. The four men were known as the "Four Kings of Cuba".

Wrestling
Ito's first wrestling match against someone was not Japanese occurred in 1909. Ito defeated American Wrestler Eddie Robinson. In 1914, Ito engaged in many matches. He initially lost but later defeated Ad Santel in a wrestling match. The loss was a result of Ito being thrown on his head by Santel. Ito at the time was a 5th degree black belt in judo.  He additionally defeated Joe Acton.

Later years
In his later years he founded the Rafu Judo Dojo in Los Angeles. His notable students included Tsutao Higami  He was also the founder of the Seattle Dojo. Ito was also an instructor of Geo Omori and Sanpo Toku.

References

Sources

 

1878 births 
Place of birth missing
1939 deaths
Japanese male judoka
Japanese jujutsuka
20th-century professional wrestlers
Japanese catch wrestlers
Japanese male mixed martial artists
Mixed martial artists utilizing judo
Mixed martial artists utilizing jujutsu
Mixed martial artists utilizing catch wrestling
American male professional wrestlers
Japanese male professional wrestlers